Chen Wen-chang is a Taiwanese chemical engineer and the current President of the National Taiwan University. Succeeding Kuan Chung-ming, he took his position as President of the University on the 8th January 2023.

Chen graduated from National Taiwan University (NTU) in 1985 with a bachelor's degree in chemical engineering and completed a doctorate in the same subject at the University of Rochester in 1993.

Chen returned to teach in Taiwan as a professor at NTU and later became dean of the College of Engineering. In 2021, he was awarded a National Chair Professorship in engineering and applied science. Chen was one of nine candidates certified by NTU's Presidential Election Committee in July 2022 to contest the office. A subsequent vote reduced the number of candidates to six, and Chen won another round of voting in October 2022.

References

Taiwanese chemical engineers
Taiwanese university and college faculty deans
20th-century Taiwanese engineers
Year of birth missing (living people)
Taiwanese expatriates in the United States
Living people
21st-century Taiwanese engineers
Academic staff of the National Taiwan University
Presidents of National Taiwan University
University of Rochester alumni
Chemical engineering academics